Monroeville is an unincorporated community located within portions of Elk Township in Gloucester County and Upper Pittsgrove Township in Salem County, New Jersey, United States. The area is served as United States Postal Service ZIP Code 08343. Monroeville is mostly filled with wooded areas and farms.

Most of the residents attend Upper Pittsgrove School if they are in the Upper Pittsgrove Township portion, although some attend Olivet Elementary in Pittsgrove Township.

Monroeville was named after Rev. Samuel Y. Monroe, and had also been called Monroe Station for the train depot located in the area. It had contained a cigar factory, a blacksmith shop and a creamery.  During the 1880s and 1890s, it was one of several South Jersey destinations settled by Russian Jewish immigrants who were offered transportation by ship from Europe, and were provided with land and a cow in farming colonies.

As of the 2010 United States Census, the population for ZIP Code Tabulation Area 08343 was 5,030. As of the 2000 Census, the population was 4,596.

References

Elk Township, New Jersey
Upper Pittsgrove Township, New Jersey
Unincorporated communities in Gloucester County, New Jersey
Unincorporated communities in Salem County, New Jersey
Unincorporated communities in New Jersey